Sollentuna FK is a Swedish football club located in Sollentuna, a municipality in Stockholm County.

Background

Sollentuna United FF was founded in 2006 with the impending merger of Turebergs IF and Edsbergs IF which became operative in the 2008 season.  Turebergs IF were promoted from  Division 3 Norra Svealand in 2007 after winning their promotion playoff.  The previous season in 2006 they won Division 4 Stockholm Norra.  The new club took the place of Turebergs IF in Division 2 Norra Svealand for the 2008 season. In 2013 Sollentuna United FF merged with Sollentuna Fotboll IF to create Sollentuna FK.

Since their foundation Sollentuna FK has participated in the middle tier of the Swedish football league system.  The club currently plays in Division 1 Norra which is the third tier of Swedish football. They play their home matches at the Sollentunavallen in Sollentuna.

Sollentuna FK are affiliated to the Stockholms Fotbollförbund.

Season to season

External links
 Sollentuna FK – Official Website

Footnotes

Football clubs in Stockholm
Association football clubs established in 2013
2013 establishments in Sweden